Tea Tree is a rural locality and town in the local government areas of Southern Midlands and Brighton in the Central and Hobart regions of Tasmania. The 2016 census determined a population of 413 for the state suburb of Tea Tree.

History
Tea Tree was gazetted as a locality in 1970.

Geography
Most boundaries of the locality are survey lines. The Main rail line passes through via the town from west to east.

Road infrastructure
The C321 route (Tea Tree Road) enters from the west and runs through via the town to the north-east, where it exits. Route C322 (Middle Tea Tree Road) starts at an intersection with C321 and runs south-east until it exits. Route C323 (Back Tea Tree Road) starts at an intersection with C321 on the western boundary and runs south-east through the locality until it exits.

References

Localities of Southern Midlands Council
Localities of Brighton Council (Tasmania)
Towns in Tasmania